"Lifestyles of the Not So Rich and Famous" is a song written by Byron Hill and Wayne Tester, and recorded by American country music artist Tracy Byrd.  It was released in April 1994 as the first single from the album No Ordinary Man.  The song won an ASCAP Award for being among the most performed country songs of 1994.

Critical reception
Larry Flick, of Billboard magazine reviewed the song favorably, saying that the song is "chock full of hilarious white trash-isms" and calls it Byrd's best single so far.

Chart positions

Year-end charts

References

1994 singles
1994 songs
Tracy Byrd songs
Songs written by Byron Hill
MCA Records singles
Song recordings produced by Jerry Crutchfield
Songs written by Wayne Tester